Ramón Osvaldo Pérez Araya (born 28 June 1963) is a Chilean former footballer who played as a forward for clubs in Chile and Switzerland.

Club career
A product of Unión Española youth system, Pérez also played for Palestino, Cobreloa, with whom he won the league title in 1992, Deportes Concepción and Deportes Linares in his homeland.

Abroad, he played in Switzerland for both AC Bellinzona and FC Baden (loan). In FC Baden, he coincided with his compatriots Eduardo Soto and Claudio Álvarez.

International career
Pérez made four appearances for the Chile senior team from 1988 to 1989.

Personal life
He is better known by his nickname Peraca.

He has worked as a taxi driver.

In 2018, he involved in a quarrel in the Club Hípico de Santiago and got shot in the right leg while he tried to help a cousin.

References

External links
 
 Ramón Pérez at National-Football-Teams.com
 Ramón Pérez at SoloFutbol.cl 

1963 births
Living people
Footballers from Santiago
Chilean footballers
Chile international footballers
Chilean expatriate footballers
Unión Española footballers
Club Deportivo Palestino footballers
AC Bellinzona players 
FC Baden players
Cobreloa footballers
Deportes Concepción (Chile) footballers
Deportes Linares footballers
Chilean Primera División players
Primera B de Chile players
Swiss Super League players
Swiss Challenge League players
Chilean expatriate sportspeople in Switzerland
Expatriate footballers in Switzerland
Association football forwards